Waking the Cadaver is an American brutal death metal band from Sayreville, New Jersey, formed in 2006. Originally called Death to Honor, the band released one demo in 2004 before changing their name to Waking the Cadaver in 2006. The band has released four albums: Perverse Recollections of a Necromangler (2007), Beyond Cops, Beyond God (2010), Real-Life Death (2013), and Authority Through Intimidation (2021). They are now signed to Unique Leader Records.

History
The band formed in January 2006 in Shore Points, New Jersey. They released a two-song demo, Demo 2006. Its two tracks, "Chased Through the Woods by a Rapist" and "Blood Splattered Satisfaction", were both later re-recorded.

On November 21, 2007, their debut album, Perverse Recollections of a Necromangler, was released on Necrohamonic Records.

On August 10, 2010, they released their second full-length album, Beyond Cops. Beyond God. and supported it with tours with death metal bands such as Napalm Death and Immolation.

On January 19, 2013, the band released a new single, "Lumped Up". They announced plans to release a new album, Real-Life Death. Real-Life Death was released digitally and sold at the band's live concert shows on October 5, 2013, and was released in stores November 5, 2013.

Their fourth album Authority Through Intimidation was released October 22, 2021.

Musical style
Waking the Cadaver has been described as brutal death metal, particularly its slam death metal offshoot. The band has also been described as deathcore.

Discography

Albums
 Perverse Recollections of a Necromangler (2007)
 Beyond Cops, Beyond God (2010)
 Real-Life Death (2013)
 Authority Through Intimidation (2021)

Demos
 Demo 2006 (2006)

Compilations
 Straight Outta tha Ground Vol.1 (In tha Ground Records) – (2007)

Singles
 "Snapped in Half" (2011)
 "Lumped Up" (2013)
 "Money Power Death" (2013)
 "Threaten Physical Force" (2021)

Members
Current 
 Don Campan - vocals (2006–2013, 2018–present)
 Michael Mayo - guitar (2008–2013, 2018–present)
 Michael Thomas - bass (2018–present)
 Marco Pitruzzella - drums (2021-present)

Former 
 Dennis Morgan - drums (2006–2013)
 John Hartman - guitar (2011–2013)
 Alex Sarnecki - bass (2012–2013)
 Steve Vermilyea – bass (2006–2011)
 Nick Palmateer – guitar (2006–2008)
 Alex Castrillon – guitar (2008–2009)
 Jerry Regan – guitar (2006–2008)
 Tristan Graham – guitar (2007)
 Matt Crismond - drums (2018–2020)
 Tim Carey - guitar (2018–2021)
 Chris Kulak - drums (2020–2021)

Timeline

References 

American death metal musical groups
American deathcore musical groups
Musical groups established in 2006
Musical groups disestablished in 2013
Musical groups reestablished in 2018
Heavy metal musical groups from New Jersey
Jersey Shore musical groups
Ferret Music artists